The 1988 Bulgarian Cup Final was the 48th final of the Bulgarian Cup, and was contested between Levski Sofia and CSKA Sofia on 11 May 1988 at Vasil Levski National Stadium in Sofia. CSKA won the final 4–1.

Match

Details

See also
1987–88 A Group
1988 Cup of the Soviet Army Final

References

External links
Video of the final

Bulgarian Cup finals
PFC CSKA Sofia matches
PFC Levski Sofia matches
Cup Final